The glycerol-3-phosphate shuttle is a mechanism that regenerates NAD+ from NADH, a by-product of glycolysis. The shuttle consists of the sequential activity of two proteins: GPD1 which transfers an electron pair from NADH to dihydroxyacetone phosphate (DHAP), forming glycerol-3-phosphate (G3P) and regenerating NAD+ needed to generate energy via glycolysis. The mitochondrial inner membrane protein GPD2 catalyzes the oxidation of G3P, regenerating DHAP in the cytosol and forming FADH2 in the mitochondrial matrix. In mammals, its activity in transporting reducing equivalents across the mitochondrial membrane is considered secondary to the malate-aspartate shuttle.

History 
The glycerol phosphate shuttle was first characterized as a major route of mitochondrial hydride transport in the flight muscles of blow flies. It was initially believed that the system would be inactive in mammals due to the predominance of lactate dehydrogenase activity over Glycerol-3-phosphate dehydrogenase 1 (GPD1) until high GPD1 and GPD2 activity were demonstrated in mammalian brown adipose tissue and pancreatic ß-islets.

Reaction 
In this shuttle, the enzyme called cytoplasmic glycerol-3-phosphate dehydrogenase 1 (GPD1 or cGPD) converts dihydroxyacetone phosphate (2) to glycerol 3-phosphate (1) by oxidizing one molecule of NADH to NAD+ as in the following reaction:

Glycerol-3-phosphate is converted back to dihydroxyacetone phosphate by an inner membrane-bound mitochondrial glycerol-3-phosphate dehydrogenase 2 (GPD2 or mGPD), this time reducing one molecule of enzyme-bound flavin adenine dinucleotide (FAD) to FADH2.  FADH2 then reduces coenzyme Q (ubiquinone to ubiquinol) whose electrons enter into oxidative phosphorylation. This reaction is irreversible.

See also 
 Malate-aspartate shuttle
 Mitochondrial shuttle

References

External links 
 http://chemistry.elmhurst.edu/vchembook/601glycolysissum.html (describes the shuttle in the context of glycolysis)

Cellular respiration